Dinosaur (stylized as DINOSAUR) is a dark ride EMV attraction at Disney's Animal Kingdom in Walt Disney World, Lake Buena Vista, Florida. The ride features a turbulent journey through the late Cretaceous period, featuring prehistoric scenes populated with dinosaur audio-animatronics. Originally named Countdown to Extinction when the park opened on April 22, 1998, the ride's name was changed to Dinosaur in 2000 to promote the Disney animated film of the same name. However, the two dinosaurs most prominently featured in the ride have always been an Iguanodon and Carnotaurus, which were both featured prominently in the film. Scenes from the movie also appear in the pre-show, to help the guests identify the Iguanodon as the film's protagonist, Aladar.

Ride experience

Queue
If the ride is busy, then guests will first wind though an outdoor area before entering the first section of the indoor queue. Once inside the first section, guests will see several small exhibits including a display of small fossils, modern animals that can be traced back to the dinosaur ages, and evidence for the several theories of mass extinction.

The second section of the indoor queue is an eight-sided room, with the upper parts of the walls displaying some artist renderings of what the age of the dinosaurs might have looked like and some fossils. The lower sections of the walls are a simulation of sedimentary rock that contain fossils. Some sections of the lower walls have windows that display some more fossils. Hanging from the ceiling is a large globe with Pangaea, and a rod connected to the globe with measurements of hundreds of thousands of miles to show how far the theoretical asteroid that impacted with earth to cause mass extinction had to travel. The defining feature of the second room is its centerpiece: a Carnotaurus fossil. In the second room, at regular time intervals, the lights dim, and Bill Nye the Science Guy shares some facts and theories about the age of dinosaurs, using the globe, the paintings, and the fossil to help out with his small lectures. After weaving through the second room, guests then enter one of two pre-show theaters.

Preshow
Guests enter a small standup theatre and a short movie comes on a projection screen. The first part of the movie is a small presentation by the fictional director of the Dino Institute, Dr. Helen Marsh (played by Phylicia Rashad). She claims that the "bare bones" approach of displaying research of prehistory is "about to become extinct." She says that the Dino Institute has created a "time rover" that has the ability to take guests to the age of the dinosaurs. She says that the rover is intended to take guests to a "breathtaking world where you will witness the most fantastic creatures to ever walk the earth." Dr. then transfers to a "live" feed of the control center for a comprehensive safety briefing. Riders are greeted in the second section of the movie by the controller Dr. Grant Seeker (played by actor Wallace Langham). Seeker decides to skip most of the safety notes and get to talking about what his intentions are. He intends to use the time rover and the guests that were supposed to take a tour to go on a mission to save an Iguanodon from extinction and bring it back to the Dino Institute. He says that he tagged him with a locator during a previous "unauthorized" field trip. He then goes on to say that the Iguanodon is at the very end of the Cretaceous period. However, Dr. Marsh comes into the control center to "correct a little misstatement." She says that the tours are intended for the Early Cretaceous, and that the rovers are locked on those coordinates. Dr. Seeker then continues his "safety briefing" by talking about flash photos and seatbelts. Dr. Marsh leaves the room during that small section of the video, and Seeker unlocks the time coordinates behind her back. Automatic doors on the opposite side of the theatre open up to the entrance of the loading area. As guests exit, the voice of Seeker is heard, reminding guests that they are “the only ones who received this mission” and to not tell anyone else.

Ride experience

Guests enter an underground research facility where the time rover will pick them up. Once the riders get on, they pull forward for a seatbelt check. They then proceed to a "security checkpoint. Suddenly, alarms and warning lights go off, indicating that Seeker's modified coordinates have been detected, and the vehicle is unauthorized to continue. Lurching forward, Seeker ignores the alarms and moves the vehicle into the "Time Tunnel", where flashing lights temporarily blind the riders. When their vision returns, they realize they have been transported to prehistoric times. When they land, guests can smell the forest and trees around them while they come across a Styracosaurus, an Alioramus eating a Brachychampsa, a Parasaurolophus (identified only as "hadrosaur"), and a Velociraptor (identified only as “raptor”). Seeker, their driver, then locks onto the signal of the tracker on and the ride becomes much bumpier. The scanner built into the rover picks up a big dinosaur, and Seeker thinks that it is the Iguanodon. He pulls the rover to a full stop, but find out that the dinosaur is a Carnotaurus. The rover takes off away from the Carnotaurus, and finds another big dinosaur with the scanner. The dinosaur is a Saltasaurus (identified only as "sauropod"). The rover starts to pull away again. The timer that counts down to the asteroid that causes the mass extinction claims that the asteroid is going to strike in 90 seconds, and the rover starts to pick up the pace. The scanner finds an Cearadactylus (identified only as "pterodactyl") that is flying directly towards them. The rover drives down a small hill and dodges the pterosaur. Now in almost complete darkness, the rover speeds through the forest and picks up a pack of Compsognathus on the scanner that is running through the forest with them. The rover falls down another small hill and loses traction. The Carnotaurus the riders saw before appears in front of them, and walks towards the Time Rover. Seeker turns on the four-wheel drive system and successfully gets the rover away just before the Carnotaurus gets the riders. The rover performs evasive maneuvers to dodge the meteors in the darkness. After dodging the meteors successfully, the rover then stumbles upon the Carnotaurus once again, which tries to lunge at them. This is where the ride takes the rider's photo. The rover takes off again into a small section of the forest where some of the trees are falling down. The scanner finds the Iguanodon, but Seeker decides to abort the mission and bring the rover back, as the asteroid is about to strike. A tree was about to fall on the rover, but the Iguanodon catches the tree and the rover proceeds as a net from the rover catches the Iguanodon (through a projection cast on the animatronic). The asteroid strikes the ground and creates a flash of light, and the Carnotaurus is seen giving one last lunge. However, at the last second, the rover transports back to the institute, where Dr. Seeker congratulates guests on making it back. The rover then proceeds to the loading station while videos on tv monitors show the Iguanodon roaming around the institute. On the right, guests can view a large mirror, which was added for a peppers ghost effect showing that the Iguanodon traveled with them. However, this effect was never implemented. The riders then get off and proceed to some stairs, which leads to the gift shop.

As guests leave, they can see Dr. Marsh and the Dino Institute employees attempting to chase down the Iguanodon and Dr. Seeker on overhead TV monitors. They can also hear radio chatter indicating what's going on.

Incidents

On April 30, 2005, a 30-year-old man from Mooresville, Indiana, lost consciousness shortly after exiting the ride and died from a heart attack moments later. An investigation showed the ride was operating correctly and was not the cause of his death; he had a pacemaker.
On May 29, 2013, a woman found a loaded pistol in a ride vehicle. The gun was reported to the ride attendant, who in turn reported the incident to authorities. The owner of the gun stated that he was unaware of Disney's policy against weapons and had a concealed weapons permit.

Notes

See also
 Indiana Jones Adventure, similar dark ride attraction
 Jurassic Park River Adventure

References

External links 
 Official site Walt Disney World
 Official Walt Disney World Dinosaur page
 A video of the full ride on YouTube
  – Patent for the Enhanced Motion Vehicle used in this attraction.
 All Ears Net Dinosaur Page * WDWMAGIC Dinosaur Page

Amusement rides introduced in 1998
Walt Disney Parks and Resorts attractions
Dark rides
Disney's Animal Kingdom
DinoLand U.S.A.
Audio-Animatronic attractions
Dinosaurs in amusement parks
Amusement rides based on film franchises
Fiction about time travel
1998 establishments in Florida